Motocoaster is a  long motorcycle roller coaster at Dreamworld on the Gold Coast, Queensland, Australia. The A$10 million ride, constructed by Intamin and opened to the public in September 2007, was associated with Australian motorcyclist Mick Doohan until 2022. It is the first motorcycle coaster in Australia, the first Intamin MotorBike Launch Coaster worldwide, and the first to feature life-size replicas of 500 cc racing bikes.

History

Construction
The coaster was constructed in the Rivertown section of the park, on the site of the Avis Vintage Cars ride, requiring their relocation to the Australian Wildlife Experience section of the park. The ride was the first constructed at Dreamworld in three years.

Opening
The coaster opened to the public on 30 September 2007.  Margaret Keech, The current minister for the Gold Coast, and Stacey McMahon, a 125 cc rider and spokesperson for the GMC Australian Grand Prix, were there for the ribbon-cutting ceremony. Mick Doohan did not personally attend the event due to participation in the Japan Grand Prix, but submitted a pre-recorded video in which he stated: "I am extremely proud to see the end result, I have really enjoyed working with Dreamworld, the new attraction truly celebrates and pays respect to a great Australian sport and its achievements."

Financial impact
Marketing for the ride contributed to a decline in Dreamworld's operating margins during the final two-quarters of 2007.

Through to 26 March 2008, the ride is credited with increasing Dreamworld's revenue by 8.8% to A$50.68 million. Park attendance by local residents spiked significantly following the launch of the coaster, although there was a decline in both interstate and international visitors during the same period.

Ride mechanics

The ride is an Intamin MotorBike Launch Coaster. Riders sit on full-scale replica 500 cc racing bikes arranged in eight cars with two riders per car. This includes 14 motorcycle seats and two sidecar seats in the rear. There are two trains, which are launched by a flywheel track. The sidecars were initially designed to be in the middle of the trains. Riders are held on the ride through a clamshell restraint system, where the top part of the bike folds over the rider's legs.

The ride has two cameras: one on the launch run, the other halfway through the ride. The ride's queue features informational decorations that teach about the history of motorcycle racing.

Reception 
In its debut year, the coaster was "narrowly beaten by a 1989 Vekoma ride for the title of world's worst steel roller coaster": the coaster ranked 356th out of the 357 coasters in the Best Steel Roller Coaster Poll. The ride was rated higher in 2008, coming in at number 278 of 392.

See also
 Jet Rescue

References

External links
 
 

Roller coasters introduced in 2007
Roller coasters in Australia
Roller coasters operated by Ardent Leisure
Dreamworld (Australia)